Asagawara Dam   is a dam in Tōkamachi, Niigata Prefecture, Japan, completed in 1945.

References 

Dams in Niigata Prefecture
Dams completed in 1945